The Calvin B. Taylor House is a historic U.S. home located at 208 Main Street, Berlin, Maryland.  The house currently serves as The Calvin B. Taylor House Museum, which displays antiques and local memorabilia.

Footnotes

External links
The Calvin B. Taylor House Museum (official website)
Calvin B. Taylor House (Ocean City Vacation and Hotels Guide website)

Berlin, Maryland
Houses in Worcester County, Maryland
Museums in Worcester County, Maryland
Taylor